Ainars Bagatskis (born 29 March 1967) is a Latvian former professional basketball player and coach, who currently works as the head coach of CSO Voluntari of the Liga Națională and the senior Ukraine national team.

Playing career

Club career
During his club playing career, Bagatskis played at the small forward position.

Latvia national team
Bagatskis was a member of the senior Latvia national basketball team, from 1992 to 2006. With Latvia, he played in four EuroBasket tournaments.

Coaching career
Bagatskis began his coaching career in the 2005–06 season, while playing his last season of professional basketball with Barons Rīga, where he stayed for one season. In 2006, he had a short stint as a head coach in one of the greatest Lithuanian teams, Žalgiris Kaunas. Since 2007, he worked as a head coach in several teams, including Valmiera, until 2009, the Russian team Yenisey Krasnoyarsk, in the 2009–10 season, Sukhumi, and Kryvbasbasket, until 2012.

In June 2012, he became the head coach of the Ukrainian team Budivelnyk Kyiv. He stayed with them for two seasons, winning the Ukrainian Basketball SuperLeague two times with them, in 2013 and 2014. In the 2013–14 season, his team made its first EuroLeague appearance in the club's history.

On 1 July 2014, he signed a one-year contract to become the head coach of the Russian team Nizhny Novgorod. Nizhny Novgorod ended their season in the VTB United League, after being eliminated by CSKA Moscow, with 3–0 series sweep, in the League's semifinals series.

On 18 June 2016, he signed a two-year contract to become an assistant coach of David Blatt's, with the Turkish club Darüşşafaka.

On December 24, 2016, Bagatskis became the head coach of the Israeli club Maccabi Tel Aviv.

On 16 May 2017, he parted ways with Maccabi Tel Aviv.

On 30 June 2018, he signed with Brose Bamberg of the Basketball Bundesliga.

National team
Following the departure of Kęstutis Kemzūra, in February 2010, he became a team selector for the senior Latvia national team. So far, his team made two EuroBasket appearances, at the EuroBasket 2011, in Lithuania, and at the EuroBasket 2013, in Slovenia.

Career statistics

EuroLeague

|-
| style="text-align:left;"| 2003–04
| style="text-align:left;" rowspan=2| Žalgiris
| 12 || 9 || 24.0 || .386 || .404 || .900 || 2.6 || .8 || .6 || .0 || 9.5 || 7.0
|-
| style="text-align:left;"| 2004–05
| 17 || 0 || 12.5 || .424 || .426 || .882 || .9 || .4 || .4 || .0 || 5.5 || 3.7
|- class="sortbottom"
| style="text-align:left;"| Career
| style="text-align:left;"|
| 29 || 9 || 17.5 || .406 || .414 || .894 || 1.6 || .6 || .4 || .0 || 7.2 || 5.1

Coaching record

EuroLeague

|- 
| align="left"|Žalgiris
| align="left"|2005–06
| 1 || 0 || 1 ||  || align="center"|Eliminated in Top 16 stage
|- 
| align="left"|Žalgiris
| align="left"|2006–07
| 14 || 2 || 12 ||  || align="center"|Eliminated in regular season
|- 
| align="left"|Budivelnyk
| align="left"|2013–14
| 10 || 2 || 8 ||  || align="center"|Eliminated in regular season
|- 
| align="left"|Nizhny Novgorod
| align="left"|2014–15
| 24 || 8 || 16 ||  || align="center"|Eliminated in Top 16 stage
|- 
| align="left"|Maccabi
| align="left"|2016–17
| 16 || 5 || 11 ||  || align="center"|Eliminated in regular season
|-class="sortbottom"
| align="center" colspan=2|Career||74||21||53||||

References

External links

Official website
Ainars Bagatskis at eurobasket.com
Ainars Bagatskis at euroleague.net (as a player)
Ainars Bagatskis at euroleague.net (as a coach)
Ainars Bagatskis at fiba.com

1967 births
Living people
ASK Riga players
BK VEF Rīga players
BK Ventspils players
BC Žalgiris coaches
BC Žalgiris players
JDA Dijon Basket players
Latvian basketball coaches
Latvian expatriate basketball people in Lithuania
Latvian men's basketball players
Maccabi Tel Aviv B.C. coaches
Small forwards
Soviet men's basketball players
Basketball players from Riga
Latvian expatriate basketball people in France
Latvian expatriate basketball people in Ukraine
Latvian expatriate basketball people in Russia
Latvian expatriate basketball people in Israel
Latvian expatriate basketball people in Georgia (country)